, provisional designation , is a trans-Neptunian object from the classical Kuiper belt, located in the outermost region of the Solar System. It was discovered on 30 January 2011, by astronomers with the Pan-STARRS survey at Haleakala Observatory, Hawaii, United States.

Orbit and classification 

 is a cubewano from the classical Kuiper belt. It is located in between the resonant plutino and twotino populations and has a low-eccentricity orbit. With an inclination significantly higher than 4–7°, it belongs to the "stirred" hot population rather than to the cold population with lower inclinations.

It orbits the Sun at a distance of 38.1–55.2 AU once every 318 years and 6 months (116,334 days; semi-major axis of 46.64 AU). Its orbit has an eccentricity of 0.18 and an inclination of 15° with respect to the ecliptic. The body's observation arc begins with a precovery at Haleakala Observatory in May 2010, or eight months prior to its official discovery observation.

Numbering and naming 

This object received the number  in the minor planet catalog. As of 2018, it has not been named.

Physical characteristics 

Johnston's archive estimates a diameter of 280 kilometers based on an assumed albedo of 0.09, while American astronomer Michael Brown, calculates a diameter of 302 kilometers, using an estimated albedo of 0.08 and an absolute magnitude of 6.0.

On his website, Brown lists this object as a "possible" dwarf planet (200–400 km), which is the category with the lowest certainty in his 5-class taxonomic system. As of 2018, no spectral type and color indices, nor a rotational lightcurve have been obtained from spectroscopic and photometric observations. The body's color, rotation period, pole and shape remain unknown.

References

External links 
 MPEC 2016-O82 : 2014 HW199, Minor Planet Electronic Circular, 17 July 2016
 M.P.E.C. statistics for F51 – All MPECs
 List of Transneptunian Objects, Minor Planet Center
 Discovery Circumstances: Numbered Minor Planets (520001)-(525000) – Minor Planet Center
 
 

523702
523702
523702
20110130